Robert Bruning (27 May 1928 – 4 March 2008) was an Australian actor and film producer, who was the founder of film production firm Gemini Productions

Biography
Bruning was born as Robert Bell in Dongara, Western Australia in 1928.  He worked as an amateur actor at the New Theatre in the Sydney suburb of Newtown in the 1940s and 1950s. Bruning also was a regular guest performer in  Homicide, Division 4, The Sullivans and A Country Practice. He also had substantial roles on Australian films such as 1970's Ned Kelly and his production credits, on sitcoms, variety, and drama add up to more than 200 hours of television.

Of his production career, he is notable for his creation of Australia's first telemovie, Is There Anybody There?, of which 21 more were made.

Gemini Productions
Bruning set up Gemini Productions in 1971; others in the company were Bill Huges (director), David Hannay (production manager), Michael Lawrence (director) and Alister Smart (director). Its first production was the TV series The Godfathers at $5,600 an episode. They then made the variety show True Blue Show. When both shows ended, Bruning had to return to acting.

Bruning felt there would be a market for Australian TV movies like the ones Aaron Spelling made in the US. He succeeded in selling Paradise (1975) to Channel 9. Although he was unhappy with the end result, it enabled Bruning to make Is There Anybody There? which he sold to Channel Seven, and was well received. The network agreed to buy three more TV movies from Bruning, Mama's Gone A-Hunting (1977), The Alternative (1977) and Gone to Ground (1977) all made for around $90,000 each. The film was shot in Sydney.

Although the films rated well, they were deficit financed which meant Gemini was losing money. (Around this time the networks would pay $70–$84,000 for a TV movie which usually cost $105–125,000. The Australian Film Commission covered the deficit.) Bruning realised he needed the protection of a bigger company and sold Gemini to Reg Grundy, agreeing to run Gemini for Grundy for two years.

Gemini made seven TV movies in 1977 which he later felt was too many. Six were made for a cost of $750,000 and followed Gemini's initial four films. "It's the largest order of locally made product ever," said Greg Brown of Seven "and we are sure viewers will be impressed."

The films were usually shot over three six-day weeks with a week lay off in between using many of the same crew. Costs were kept down by using urban settings and locking down scripts.

Bruning died suddenly on 4 March 2008, in Wellington, New Zealand, aged 79. He was survived by his third wife, Anne, a line producer, their son Nic and three daughters from previous marriages: Ariane, Lucie and Sophie.

Selected filmography
 That Lady from Peking (1969, released 1975) - actor
The Godfathers (1971–72) (TV series) - producer, actor
Crisis (1972) (TV movie) - producer
The Spoiler (1972) (TV series) - producer
Jesus Christ Superstar (1972) (documentary) - producer
The People Next Door (1973) (TV series) - producer
Sunday Too Far Away (1975) - actor
Paradise (1975) (TV movie) - producer
 Is There Anybody There? (1976) (TV movie) - producer
Mama's Gone A-Hunting (1977) (TV movie) - producer, story
The Alternative (1977) (TV movie) - producer
Gone to Ground (1977) (TV movie) - producer
Death Train (1977) (TV movie) - producer
Roses Bloom Twice (1977) (TV movie) - producer
The Night Nurse (1978) (TV movie) - producer
The Newman Shame (1978) (TV movie) - producer
Image of Death (1978) (TV movie) - producer
Plunge Into Darkness (1978) (TV movie) - producer
Demolition (1978) (TV movie) - producer
Snapshot (1979) - actor
The Settlement (1984) - producer
Rafferty's Rules (1988–91) (TV series) - producer
The Time Game (1991) - executive producer
The Distant Home (1992) - executive producer
You and Me and Uncle Bob (1993) - producer
Big Ideas (1993) - producer
Blue Heelers (1994) - supervising producer
The Territorians (1996) (TV movie) - producer
13 Gantry Row (1996) (TV Movie) -producer

References

Notes

External links

Obituary at Urban Cinefile

1928 births
2008 deaths
Male actors from Western Australia
Australian male television actors
Australian male film actors
Australian film producers
People from Dongara, Western Australia